The Ford Creek Patrol Cabin in Glacier National Park was built in 1928. The National Park Service Rustic log structure was a significant resource both architecturally and historically as a network of shelters, approx. one day's travel apart, for patrolling backcountry rangers.

The Ford Creek cabin was the first of four identical cabins built to National Park Service plan G913 in 1928-29 by private contractors, described as "good log men", at a total cost of $350.

It was destroyed in a suspected arson fire in late July 2020.

References

Ranger stations in Glacier National Park (U.S.)
Park buildings and structures on the National Register of Historic Places in Montana
Residential buildings completed in 1928
Log cabins in the United States
National Park Service rustic in Montana
National Register of Historic Places in Flathead County, Montana
Log buildings and structures on the National Register of Historic Places in Montana
1928 establishments in Montana
National Register of Historic Places in Glacier National Park